Zhang Mengyu (born 11 August 1998) is a Chinese taekwondo athlete. She won the bronze medal at the 2017 World Taekwondo Championships on the women's welterweight category.

References

External links

Chinese female taekwondo practitioners
Living people
Sportspeople from Guangdong
People from Huizhou
1998 births
Taekwondo practitioners at the 2018 Asian Games
Asian Games medalists in taekwondo
Asian Games bronze medalists for China
Medalists at the 2018 Asian Games
World Taekwondo Championships medalists
Asian Taekwondo Championships medalists
Taekwondo practitioners at the 2020 Summer Olympics
Olympic taekwondo practitioners of China
21st-century Chinese women